Çatalzeytin is a town in the Kastamonu Province in the Black Sea region of Turkey. It is the seat of Çatalzeytin District. Its population is 3,200 (2021).

References

External links
 Çatalzeytin Mektubu Gazetesi. A local newspaper and information website 

Populated places in Kastamonu Province
Populated coastal places in Turkey
Çatalzeytin District